Othella Dallas (September 26, 1925 - November 28, 2020) was an American dancer and jazz singer. After working in Paris and Zurich, she opened a dance school in Basel's Gundeldingen quarter in 1975, where she taught the Dunham technique.

Life and career
Dallas, whose mother was the first African American pianist to be heard on the St. Louis radio, comes from a musical family; her half-brother is Frank Strozier. W. C. Handy was her babysitter. In 1943 she was discovered by Katherine Dunham at a school performance in St. Louis, who brought her to her dance company in New York. As a solo dancer for the Dunham Company, Strozier toured as far as South America and Europe. After their marriage, she moved to France in 1949. There she began to perform as a singer from 1952, also with greats like Sidney Bechet and Nat King Cole. In addition, she founded a dance school there, as in the 1960s in Zurich, where she taught Margrit Läubli, Daniel Spoerri, Ruedi Walter and Margrit Rainer. Duke Ellington wrote two songs for her; The singer's first recordings were made in 1967 with Mac Strittmatter's septet. Further albums were made from the 1980s. On her seventieth birthday, she performed for three weeks in the Basler Tabourettli, and later toured Russia. Her CD 2008 I Live the Life I Love (2008) gave her appearances at the Festival da Jazz in St. Moritz as well as at the Theater Rigiblick in Zurich.

Andres Brütsch made the documentary "Othella Dallas - What Is Luck? About her", which premiered in 2015.

Her dance workshops, which she held not only in Basel, but also in other European cities such as London, were very popular because she was the last still active dance teacher who had danced with Katherine Dunham. As a jazz singer, Dallas toured Switzerland with her band in 2019 as part of the "94th Anniversary Tour".

Discography 
 Little Girl from Memphis: The Show 1925-1995 (Mons Records 1995, with Thomas Moeckel, Philippe Hammel, Kirk Lightsey, Tibor Elekes, John Betsch)
 Fever for Bluesy Jazz (Mons Records 1995, with Matthias Bröde, Hubert Nuss, Christian Ramond, Hans Braber)
 What's This Thing Called Love? (Brambus Records 2000, with Pius Baschnagel, Nick Mens, Thomas Silvestri)
 I Live the Life I Love (Suonix 2008)

Awards 
 2019: Swiss Jazz Award

References

External links 
Official website

1925 births
2020 deaths
Musicians from Memphis, Tennessee
African-American jazz musicians
American women jazz singers
American jazz singers
American female dancers
21st-century dancers
Jazz musicians from Tennessee
American expatriates in Switzerland
Brambus Records artists
African-American women musicians
20th-century African-American people
20th-century African-American women
21st-century African-American people
21st-century African-American women